Chakral is a village of Chakwal District in the Punjab Province of Pakistan, it is part of Chakwal Tehsil.
It is a village located approximately 10 kilometres outside Chakwal, Punjab, Pakistan.

Education
Both government and private institutes exist in village. There are a number of schools in Chakral village. Separate institutions for girls are boys are there and some institutions support co-education.

Other Facilities
Allied bank is also situated in the village which is only bank available in nearby villages.  A Basic Health Unit is also located in Chakral which is only government hospital in nearby areas, thus facilitating the population of all villages around.

References

Populated places in Chakwal District